The 2021 Georgia Tech Yellow Jackets baseball team represented Georgia Tech during the 2021 NCAA Division I baseball season. The Yellow Jackets played their home games at Russ Chandler Stadium as a member of the Atlantic Coast Conference. They were led by head coach Danny Hall, in his 28th season at Georgia Tech.

Georgia Tech finished the regular season winning the Coastal Division. In the 2021 ACC baseball tournament, the Yellow Jackets reached the semifinals before losing to NC State. Georgia Tech earned an at-large bid into the 2021 NCAA Division I baseball tournament, where they were the second seed in the Nashville Regional. They were eliminated by Vanderbilt in the Regional. Georgia Tech finished the season with a 31–25 overall record.

Previous season

The 2020 Georgia Tech Yellow Jackets baseball team notched a 11–5 (2–1) regular season record. The season prematurely ended on March 12, 2020 due to concerns over the COVID-19 pandemic.

Personnel

Roster

Coaching staff

Game log

Nashville Regional

Rankings

2021 MLB draft

References

External links 
 Georgia Tech Baseball 2021 schedule

Georgia Tech Yellow Jackets
Georgia Tech Yellow Jackets baseball seasons
Georgia Tech Yellow Jackets baseball
Georgia Tech